Fujiwara no Asatada (Japanese: 藤原 朝忠, also 中納言朝忠, Chunagon Asatada) (910 – January 19, 966) was a middle Heian waka and Japanese nobleman. He was designated a member of the Thirty-six Poetry Immortals and one of his poems is included in the famous anthology Hyakunin Isshu.Asatada's poems are included in official poetry anthologies from the Gosen Wakashū onward. A personal collection known as the Asatadashū also remains.

External links
E-text of his poems in Japanese

910 births
966 deaths
Japanese male poets
Fujiwara clan
10th-century Japanese poets
Hyakunin Isshu poets